I Am the Last of All the Field That Fell: A Channel is an album by British experimental music group, Current 93. It was released on 4 March 2014 through The Spheres record label. The album, which was premiered live on 12 February 2014 at Union Chapel in Islington, features contributions from various artists, including James Blackshaw, Andrew Liles, Ossian Brown, Antony Hegarty, Nick Cave, John Zorn and These New Puritans member Jack Barnett.

Description
The first track of this album quotes the first of Nikolai Obukhov's Six prières.

Critical reception

Upon its release, I Am the Last of All the Field That Fell: A Channel generally received rave reviews. At Metacritic, which assigns a normalized rating out of 100 to reviews from critics, the album received an average score of 72, which indicates "generally favorable reviews", based on 4 reviews. Thom Jurek of AllMusic praised the album, stating: "As displayed on I Am the Last of All the Field That Fell: A Channel, it's also simultaneously holistic, maddening, erotic, bleak, bright, and most of all, visionary." Uncut wrote: "I Am The Last has a wind in its sails, though, thanks to Tibet's preacher vigour, and an extraordinary guestlist." Nevertheless, Grayson Currin of Pitchfork was mixed in his assessment of the album: "There are flutes and poetry readings, floods of noise and wisps of bass clarinet. Still, such an astounding lineup only serves to reinforce the disappointment of the flat and oftentimes gangly Field."

Track listing
All songs written by Current 93.
 "The Invisible Church" – 6:32
 "Those Flowers Grew – 8:42
 "Kings And Things – 6:22
 "With The Dromedaries – 5:37
 "The Heart Full Of Eyes – 5:46
 "Mourned Winter Then – 5:55
 "And Onto PickNickMagick – 7:52
 "Why Did The Fox Bark? – 6:22
 "I Remember The Berlin Boys – 3:49
 "Spring Sand Dreamt Larks – 4:32
 "I Could Not Shift The Shadow – 6:12

Personnel
 Jack Barnett – organ, sound design, voices
 James Blackshaw – bass
 Ossian Brown – hurdy-gurdy, SiderealSingSong
 Nick Cave – voice, voices
 Antony Hegarty – voice, voices
 Reinier Van Houdt – piano
 Norbert Kox – voice
 Andrew Liles – electric channel, mixing
 Tony McPhee – acoustic guitar, electric guitar
 Jon Seagroatt – bass clarinet, flute
 Carl Stokes – drums, percussion
 David Tibet – voice, lyrics, mixing
 Bobbie Watson – voices
 John Zorn – saxophone
 The Bricoleur – mastering
 Seadna McPhail – engineering
 Pablo Clements – Nick Cave engineering
 James Griffith – Nick Cave engineering
 Alex Nizich – Antony engineering

References

External links
 

2014 albums
Current 93 albums